Rangsit is the current northern terminus of the SRT Dark Red Line in Rangsit, Pathum Thani Province, Thailand. It also serves intercity State Railway of Thailand trains on the Northern Line and Northeastern Line. 

Rangsit Station is located next to Rattanakosin 200 years Village near Future Park Rangsit.

History 
Rangsit station opened as a stop on the first railway in Thailand between Bangkok to Ayutthaya in 1896. Its initial location was at the former Khlong Rangsit Halt, located around 1.7 km south of the current location and was a railway station at the time. It was in use until the general public requested the construction of a station closer to the main road. On 10 July 1994 a newer railway station was built at the current location and Khlong Rangsit was then reduced to halt and remained serving only commuter trains. Khlong Rangsit Halt officially closed on 15 September 2020 in preparation for SRT Dark Red Line trial runs. This new Rangsit station structure remained in use until the construction of the SRT Dark Red Line in 2013. A temporary station was constructed and remained in use until 2020 when the current structure opened.

Station layout

Gallery

References 

Railway stations in Thailand